North Okaw Township is one of twelve townships in Coles County, Illinois, USA.  As of the 2010 census, its population was 983 and it contained 377 housing units. The Kaskaskia River flows through the township.  The Cook Mills Consolidated oil field is within this township.  The township changed its name from Okaw Township on May 7, 1860.

Geography

Unincorporated towns
 Cooks Mills
(This list is based on USGS data and may include former settlements.)

Cemeteries
The township contains five cemeteries: Brann, Mount Zion, Pleasant Grove, Smith and Zoar.

Major highways
  US Route 45
  Illinois Route 121

Demographics

School districts
 Arcola Consolidated Unit School District 306
 Arthur Community Unit School District 305
 Mattoon Community Unit School District 2
 Sullivan Community Unit School District 300

Political districts
 Illinois' 15th congressional district
 State House District 110
 State Senate District 55

References
 
 United States Census Bureau 2007 TIGER/Line Shapefiles
 United States National Atlas

External links
 City-Data.com
 Illinois State Archives

Adjacent townships 

Townships in Coles County, Illinois
Townships in Illinois